Buy-to-let is a British phrase referring to the purchase of a property specifically to let out, that is to rent it out. A buy-to-let mortgage is a mortgage loan specifically designed for this purpose. Buy-to-let properties are usually residential but the term also encompasses student property investments and hotel room investments.

History
Before the 1980s the number of private individuals who became landlords was very small. Buying a property to rent was seen as the preserve of professional landlords and persons who were sufficiently wealthy to pay cash or having sizable deposits enabling them to obtain commercial-style mortgages. The modern 'buy-to-let' mortgage was not available and the possibility of purchasing property as a means of funding a retirement income did not occur to most people. The infrastructure of loans, advice, and information was not available.

The critical change came with the Housing Act of 1988 when the assured shorthold tenancy came into being. This gave potential landlords and lenders the confidence that tenants would only reside in the property for a fixed period.

Since the mid-to-late 1990s buy-to-let has grown strongly. According to the Council of Mortgage Lenders, lenders advanced more than 1.7 million buy-to-let loans between 1999 and 2015. Over the past 12 years the private rented doubled in size. Buy-to-let mortgage balances outstanding recently grew to more than £200 billion – equivalent to the gross domestic product of Hong Kong.

Benefits and risk
As for all property rental, the benefits for a buy-to-let landlord can include a stable income from rental receipts and an accumulation of wealth if house prices go up. Rising house prices in the UK have made buy-to-let a popular way to invest. The main risk involves leveraged speculation, where the landlord takes a loan to buy the property with the expectation that the house can be sold later for a higher price, or that rental income will meet or exceed the cost of the loan. In the best outcome for the landlord they will have benefited from the use of the lending banks money indicating that they have allocated the capital more efficiently than professional investors could have done. If the landlord cannot meet the conditions of their mortgage repayments then the bank will seek to take possession of the property and sell it to gain the loaned money. If prices have fallen, leveraging could leave the landlord in negative equity.

Further risks are substantial changes in Government policy (see the section below).

Yields
Recent figures from the National Landlords Association (NLA) suggest that, as of September 2014, 27% of landlords who let out a single property and 19% of landlords who let out between two and four properties either break even or run at a loss.

On average, gross buy-to-let yields (the annual return on investment before the deduction of running costs) stood at 5.1% as of December 2014. This represented a decrease of 0.2 pp from average yields in December 2013.

Gross rental yields vary across the country with the highest yields delivered in Scotland at 6.1% and cities in the north of England, whilst yields in London stand at 4.1%.

Gross rental yields in the world's premier cities range between 1.6% (in Taipei) and 11.7% (in Moldova's Chisinau). Gross rental yields on residential property have trended down globally for several years, and have generally continued to fall since the housing crisis.

Buy-to-let mortgages
Buy-to-let mortgage is a mortgage arrangement in which an investor borrows money to purchase property in the private rented sector in order to let it out to tenants. Buy-to-let mortgages have been on offer in the UK since 1996.

Lenders calculate how much they are willing to lend using a different formula than for an owner-occupied property. They tend to look at the expected monthly rental income to determine the maximum loan available. Depending on the lender, borrowers might also be allowed to include their own personal income in the calculation of the maximum amount that they can borrow. First-time landlords might also be required to have a separate annual income of at least £25,000. For an owner-occupied property, the calculation is typically a multiple of the owner's annual income.

The most common type of buy-to-let mortgage is an interest only option. The interest rate on the mortgage can be fixed or variable. Fixed rates means that the payments would not fluctuate, and variable rates means that the payments may go up or down in line with the Bank of England base rate. The interest rates and fees that are offered on BTL mortgages are, on average, slightly higher than those for an owner-occupied mortgage. This is due to the perception amongst banks and other lending institutions that BTL mortgages represent a greater risk than residential owner-occupier mortgages.

Many people may not be able to qualify for a buy-to-let mortgage. Criteria for acceptance can include deposit amounts, credit rating, and more. 

In the late 1990s and during the early part of the 21st century, this type of investment became popular and helped drive house prices dramatically upwards.

Buy-to-let and negative publicity
Buy-to-let has experienced much poor press over the past few years, with many commentators believing that it has contributed to rampant house price inflation. Oxford Economics stated in August 2007 that buy-to-let is "undoubtedly contributing to the overvaluation of housing".

One of the difficulties in determining how buy-to-let has contributed to the house price inflation is that there have been concurrent changes in the property market, such as population increase, and substantial foreign direct investment in property.

Figures released by UK Finance for the third quarter of 2019 showed a 40% year-on-year increase for buy-to-let repossessions.

Changes in Government policy

Tenant protection

The government has taken steps to protect tenants over recent years, including compulsory third party deposit protection schemes and compulsory licensing of homes in multiple occupation (HMOs).

The Queen's Speech 2022 committed to a Bill in the 2022-23 session to abolish 'no-fault' section 21 evictions in the private rented sector. Rent review clauses will be abolished and landlords will only be allowed to put up their rents once a year. Two months' notice of any rent increase must be given.

Tax treatment
Until 2015, Government policy in respect of buy-to-let had been relatively benign, but this changed in the Budgets and Autumn Statement of 2015. Four major steps were taken to reduce the attractiveness of the investment:
 Restriction of tax relief on mortgage finance costs to basic rate tax only.
 Removal of 10% 'wear and tear' allowance.
 Introduction of additional 3% Stamp duty surcharge.
 Accelerated payment schedule for Capital Gains Tax due.

(The changes around tax relief on mortgage finance costs referred to above mean landlords can deduct only the equivalent of basic rate relief on their tax return, which can cause their personal taxation to be pushed into a higher income tax band even if they are not receiving sufficient income to justify it under other circumstances.)

Enhanced tax collection measures
The government has also taken steps to improve tax collection from BTL landlords over recent years, measures include:
 Giving HMRC access to third party deposit protection schemes (see above).
 Mandatory reporting of landlord details by estate agents to HMRC.
 Giving HMRC access to licence details of homes in multiple occupation (see above).
 Dedicated HMRC tax taskforces deployed to hunt down tax-evading landlords.

Prudential Regulation Authority changes to buy-to-let lending criteria
The Prudential Regulation Authority regulates a large number, but not all, buy-to-let lenders

Phase I

In September 2016, the PRA announced a deadline of January 1st, 2017, for lenders to put in place recommended new minimum underwriting standards for buy-to-let applications.

The PRA stated that the determination of affordability should incorporate an Interest coverage ratio (ICR) calculation, which it defined as: “the ratio of the expected monthly rental income from the buy-to-let property to the monthly interest payments which take into account likely future interest rate increases.”

At the time of its Supervisory Statement SS 13/16, in September 2016, the mortgage industry standard for setting the minimum ICR threshold was 125%. Subsequently, the majority of lenders set a minimum ICR threshold of 145%. 

The PRA guidelines went further, recommending that lenders assess a borrower’s ability to keep up monthly mortgage payments if rates went up in the future, suggesting that firms should apply an assumed minimum borrower interest rate of 5.5%.

Phase II

Lenders who fell under the PRA rules, had to interpret a second set of changes and implement these by September 30th, 2017. 
Under the second phase of PRA Rules, the underwriting process applied by lenders became much stricter, particularly for buy-to-let landlords owning four or more properties, labelled ‘portfolio landlords’.

In the Supervisory Statement (SS13/16), the PRA stated:

“The PRA expects firms to recognise that existing experience and skills acquired in buy-to-let lending do not automatically translate into equivalent skills when assessing portfolio landlords. Lending to portfolio landlords is inherently more complex given the quantum of debt in aggregate, the cash flows and costs arising from multiple tenancies and potential risks of property and/or geographical concentrations.”

With the PRA changes, lenders now had to look in much more depth at the borrower’s finances.
However, lender interpretation of the new rules varied greatly; with some lenders opting to no longer offer buy-to-let products to portfolio landlords, while others adopted differing approaches to underwriting to this demographic. 
Portfolio landlords must now submit significantly more information about their existing properties, rental income and business plans than were required prior to this change.

Buy-to-leave
In the UK, particularly in London, there is a phenomenon known as 'buy-to-leave' where investors buy properties and leave them empty in order to benefit from rising house prices without the hassle of having to deal with tenants. Nationally 'buy-to-leave' accounts for a small percentage of vacant properties according to the charity Empty Homes, but Kensington and Chelsea council estimated in 2015 that as many as one in four houses in certain parts of their neighbourhood are affected, driving up prices while restricting the number of households that actually live there. Overall long-term empty houses account for 2% of properties in Kensington and Chelsea. In north London, Camden council managed to reduce the number of empty homes by charging a surcharge of 50% on council tax on homes left empty for more than two years.

Some politicians have blamed overseas investors for buying homes and leaving them empty, but research has found that only 2% of overseas buyers of newly built London property would use the property as a second home, with 65% instead intending to rent them out, and 33% buying them as homes for children attending university in London.

As of 2016 prime central London house prices began falling, reducing the attractiveness of "buy to leave".

See also
 Build to rent
 Remortgage

References

External links

 Council of Mortgage Lenders - The association that represents all major UK mortgage lenders.
 Association of Residential Letting Agents - The organisation that represents landlords operating to professional standards.

Real estate investing
Housing in the United Kingdom